Kawdy Mountain is a subglacial mound on the Kawdy Plateau, the northernmost sub-plateau of the Stikine Plateau in northwestern British Columbia, Canada. It consists of nearly horizontal beds of basaltic lava, capping outward dipping beds of fragmental volcanic rocks and last erupted in Pleistocene. Kawdy Mountain is one of many basaltic volcanic features of the Stikine Volcanic Belt, which is forming because the North American tectonic plate is stretching slightly as it moves to the west.

See also
 List of Northern Cordilleran volcanoes
 List of volcanoes in Canada
 Northern Cordilleran Volcanic Province
 Volcanism of Canada
 Volcanism of Western Canada

References
 

Cassiar Country
Volcanoes of British Columbia
One-thousanders of British Columbia
Subglacial mounds of Canada
Northern Cordilleran Volcanic Province
Pleistocene volcanoes
Monogenetic volcanoes
Stikine Plateau